Captain's Blood is a novel by William Shatner, co-written with Judith and Garfield Reeves-Stevens, based upon the television series Star Trek. The novel was released in 2002 in hardcover format. It is the second novel in the "Totality" trilogy.  The story began with Captain's Peril and concludes with Captain's Glory.

Synopsis
Following the explosive events of Star Trek Nemesis, the Romulan Star Empire is in disarray, and Ambassador Spock attempts to render aid by launching a last-ditch effort to reunify the Romulans with their distant forebears, the Vulcans. But when Spock is publicly assassinated at a Romulan peace rally, Starfleet and the Federation are unable to search for the criminals responsible without triggering an intergalactic war. Thus, it falls to James T. Kirk, now retired, to investigate his beloved friend's murder.

Given clandestine assistance by Captain Will Riker of the Starship Titan, and accompanied by his good friend Jean-Luc Picard, Kirk travels to Romulus as a civilian, along with his five-year-old child, Joseph, the cantankerous Doctor Leonard McCoy, retired Chief Engineer Montgomery Scott, as well as several members of Picard's crew, still waiting to return to duty on the badly damaged U.S.S. Enterprise NCC-1701-E.

But on Romulus' sister world, Remus, Kirk unexpectedly encounters an alluring enemy from his past as Picard and he discover that Spock's apparent murder hides an even deeper mystery, literally reaching beyond the limits of the galaxy. Trapped on a deadly, alien world on the eve of a Romulan civil war that could plunge the galaxy into a civilization-ending conflict, Kirk's investigation at last brings him to the heart of a staggering conspiracy.

Now, he discovers the true threat facing the Romulans, and is forced into the heartrending realization that for peace to prevail, he must sacrifice the freedom of his son, whose very blood holds the secret to his startling destiny.

References

External links

 Review at SFFAudio

2002 American novels
Novels based on Star Trek: The Original Series
Novels based on Star Trek: The Next Generation
Novels by William Shatner
Novels by Judith and Garfield Reeves-Stevens
Novels set in the 24th century